In Japanese,  is money offered to the gods or bodhisattvas.

Used to collect offerings, a saisen box is typically a wooden coin box, with a grate for the top cover. This design allows coins to be tossed in, while still preventing the money from being retrieved easily. Some have grates made of round bars, or have borders that slope downward, allowing the money to slide into the box easily.

Notes

References
 Iwanami  Japanese dictionary, 6th Edition (2008), DVD version

See also 

 Mite box
 Offertory

Containers
Coins
Alms
Shinto religious objects
Alms in Buddhism